King Zhuang of Zhou (died 682 BC), personal name Ji Tuo, was the fifteenth king of the Chinese Zhou dynasty and the third of the Eastern Zhou. He ruled 696–682 BC as a successor of his father, King Huan of Zhou. He was later succeeded by his son, King Xi of Zhou, in 682 BC. His younger son was Prince Tui.

Family
Concubines:
 Yao Ji, of the Yao clan, the mother of Prince Tui

Sons:
 First son, Prince Huqi (d. 677 BC), ruled as King Xi of Zhou from 681–677 BC
 Prince Tui (696–673 BC), claimed the throne of Zhou from 675–673 BC

Ancestry

See also
Family tree of ancient Chinese emperors

Notes 

682 BC deaths
Zhou dynasty kings
7th-century BC Chinese monarchs
Year of birth unknown